Ectoedemia scobleella is a moth of the family Nepticulidae. It was described by Joël Minet in 2004. It is known from Madagascar.

References

Nepticulidae
Moths of Africa
Moths described in 2004